The Khlong Lan dwarf gecko (Hemiphyllodactylus khlonglanensis) is a species of gecko. It is endemic to western Thailand.

References

Hemiphyllodactylus
Reptiles described in 2018
Endemic fauna of Thailand
Geckos of Thailand